Har Senaim or Senaim (Arabic: Hafur el-Qurn, or Tell el-Hafur, or ), is an archaeological site that sits on a peak near Mount Hermon in the Israeli-occupied portion of the Golan Heights,  north east of Kiryat Shmona and  from Banias.

History
The site features a Roman temple and settlement that has been included in a group of Temples of Mount Hermon. The ruins of a second Ancient Greek temple were also found nearby. The Roman temple featured an altar carved with a relief of Helios, the sun god. The shrine at Har Senaim was carved out of solid bedrock. Various ancient Greek inscriptions were found at the site. One inscription found on the altar called upon the great Gods in an appeal for the salvation of the Emperor Hadrian. Other finds included a basalt animal muzzle and a brass ring that was decorated with the image of a merman. Several coins were found dating to Byzantine and Mamluk periods. The complex at Har Senaim has been suggested to be a cult site or funerary garden and compared to the high places mentioned in the Books of Kings.

References

Further reading
 Shim'on Dar. "The History of the Hermon Settlements", Palestine Exploration Quarterly, 120, pp. 26–44, 1988.
 Har Senaim – Archaeological Survey of Israel (Photos of finds. Hebrew description.)

Archaeological sites on the Golan Heights
Tourist attractions in the Golan Heights
Helios
Roman sites in Syria
Ancient Greek archaeological sites in Syria